Countess Róża Potocka (1849–1937) was a Polish noblewoman, landowner and by birth member of the illustrious House of Potocki.

Early life 
She was born in Krakow as the eldest child and the eldest daughter of Count Adam Józef Potocki and his wife, Countess Katarzyna Branicka.

Biography 
She was married two times, first to Count Władysław Krasiński (1844-1873) since 20 June 1868 (Krzeszowice) and than to Count Edward Aleksander Raczyński (1847-1926), since 2 October 1886 (Zakopane). She had three children with Krasiński, Adam Krasiński, Elżbieta Maria Krasińska and Zofia Krasińska, as well as two children with Raczyński, Roger Adam Raczyński and Edward Bernard Raczyński.

Sources
 Andrzej Władysław Korusiewicz: Panowie na Krzeszowicach  s. 135. wyd. Towarzystwo Słowaków w Polsce; .
 „Sławne Polki”, wyd. PODSIEDLIK-RANIOWSKI I SPÓŁKA.

External links

1849 births
1937 deaths
Roza Potocka (1849-1937)